Mijo Studenović  (born 7 October 1985) is a Bosnian-Herzegovinian professional football defender who plays in the German amateur leagues.

Club career
Studenović previously played for HNK Cibalia in the Croatian Prva HNL. He also played for NK Široki Brijeg in the Bosnian Premier League.

He later played in the Austrian lower leagues.

International career
Studenović made one appearance for an unofficial Bosnia and Herzegovina selection in 2007 against Poland.

References

External links
 
 Mijo Studenović at playernavi.com
 Mijo Studenović at fanreport.com

1985 births
Living people
People from Odžak
Association football central defenders
Bosnia and Herzegovina footballers
HNK Orašje players
NK Široki Brijeg players
HNK Cibalia players
NK Hrvatski Dragovoljac players
HNK Suhopolje players
NK Marsonia players
FC Rapperswil-Jona players
Premier League of Bosnia and Herzegovina players
Croatian Football League players
First Football League (Croatia) players
First League of the Federation of Bosnia and Herzegovina players
Swiss 1. Liga (football) players
Austrian Landesliga players
Bosnia and Herzegovina expatriate footballers
Expatriate footballers in Croatia
Bosnia and Herzegovina expatriate sportspeople in Croatia
Expatriate footballers in Switzerland
Bosnia and Herzegovina expatriate sportspeople in Switzerland
Expatriate footballers in Germany
Bosnia and Herzegovina expatriate sportspeople in Germany
Expatriate footballers in Austria
Bosnia and Herzegovina expatriate sportspeople in Austria